Amélia Judith Ernesto is an Angolan politician for UNITA and a member of the National Assembly of Angola.

References

Living people
Members of the National Assembly (Angola)
UNITA politicians
21st-century Angolan women politicians
21st-century Angolan politicians
Year of birth missing (living people)
Place of birth missing (living people)